The Piano Sonata No. 1 in F minor, Op. 11, was composed by Robert Schumann from 1833 to 1835. He published it anonymously as "Pianoforte Sonata, dedicated to Clara by Florestan and Eusebius".

Eric Frederick Jensen describes the sonata as 'the most unconventional and the most intriguing' of Schumann's piano sonatas due to its unusual structure. The Aria is based on his earlier Lied setting, "An Anna" or "Nicht im Thale". Schumann later told his wife, Clara, that the sonata was "a solitary outcry for you from my heart ... in which your theme appears in every possible shape".

The four movements are as follows:

References

External links
 
  performed by Alexander Kobrin

Piano music by Robert Schumann
1835 compositions
Schumann 1
Compositions in F-sharp minor